The 2021 Sochi Formula 3 round was the seventh and final race of the 2021 FIA Formula 3 Championship. It took place at the last Sochi Autodrom and featured three races from 24 to 26 September in support of the 2021 Russian Grand Prix.
Dennis Hauger clinched the drivers' championship in the first race after a second-placed finish. However, Trident clinched their first teams' championship ever in Formula 3 after securing a double podium lock-up for the Italian squad in the Feature Race, with Jack Doohan winning his fourth race of the season whilst teammate Clément Novalak finished third.

Classification

Qualifying

Sprint Race 1

Sprint Race 2 
Sprint Race 2 was cancelled due to adverse weather conditions.

Feature Race

Final championship standings 

Drivers' Championship standings

Teams' Championship standings

 Note: Only the top five positions are included for both sets of standings.
 Note: Bold names include both Drivers' and Teams' Champion respectively.

See also 
 2021 Russian Grand Prix
 2021 Sochi Formula 2 round

References 

|- style="text-align:center"
|width="35%"|Previous race:
|width="30%"|FIA Formula 3 Championship2021 season
|width="40%"|Next race:2022 Sakhir Formula 3 round

2021 FIA Formula 3 Championship
Sochi Formula 3
Sochi Formula 3 round